Euproctis varians is a moth of the family Erebidae first described by Francis Walker in 1855. It is found in India, Sri Lanka, the Maldives, Celebes and China.

The caterpillar is known to feed on Ricinus communis and Brassica oleracea.

References

Moths of Asia
Moths described in 1855